Gareth Irvin Hale is an English comedian and actor, who is best known as one half of the comedy duo Hale and Pace, with his friend and comic partner Norman Pace.

Biography

Hale and his comedy partners were both  former teachers, their comedy partnership has fronted several television programmes, most notably Hale and Pace, Pushing Up Daisies, h&p@bbc and Jobs for the Boys. As straight actors they played the title roles in the 1993 ITV dramatisation of Dalziel and Pascoe and made a guest appearance together in Survival, a 1989 Doctor Who serial.

Hale was a regular on the Channel 5 soap opera Family Affairs, playing Doug MacKenzie (2003–2005) and appeared in the 2004 "Parenthood" episode of the medical drama series Casualty as a parent of a child with Down syndrome. In 2007 Hale and Pace appeared in the Christmas special of Extras, called "The Extra Special Series Finale", playing themselves. In 2008, Hale joined the cast of The Royal in the role of the head porter, and in late 2009 he played Scrooge in an adaptation of Charles Dickens' A Christmas Carol.

In 2015 Hale appeared as Commissioner Busby in the BBC TV series Father Brown (episode 3.15 "The Owl of Minerva"). In April 2015 Hale became the station voice of Sam FM, a music based radio station covering Southern England. In 2015 he made a guest appearance as Teddy Arseholes in an episode of the BBC comedy series Cradle to Grave based on the autobiography of Danny Baker, Going to Sea in a Sieve. In 2018 Hale appeared in the comedy TV series Benidorm with Norman Pace. In 2021, Hale plays Grandpa Maury in Nickelodeon series Goldies Oldies.

References

External links

Living people
Alumni of the University of Greenwich
English male comedians
English male soap opera actors
People from Hedon
Year of birth missing (living people)